The Dominion Building is a historic structure on the corner of Mercer Street and Victoria Street in Wellington, New Zealand. Originally designed as the headquarters of The Dominion newspaper, it now houses a mix of apartments, offices and retail areas.

A distinctive seven-storey building of some elegance, the Dominion has a frontage of stone imported from Caen in France and interiors of Queensland marble. The building follows the bend in the road. Its most striking feature is topped by a copper-covered tower with a lantern turret.

In the mid-1970s, The Dominion newspaper moved out of the building. The complex was redesigned by Ian Athfield in 1995.

The building is classified as a "Category 2" by Heritage New Zealand.

References

External links

The Dominion Building website
Listing on the New Zealand Heritage website

Buildings and structures in Wellington City
Heritage New Zealand Category 2 historic places in the Wellington Region
1920s architecture in New Zealand